Actibacterium naphthalenivorans is a Gram-negative, aerobic, naphthalene-degrading, moderately halophilic and motile bacterium from the genus Actibacterium with a single flagellum which has been isolated from tidal flat sediments from the South Sea in Korea.

References

External links
Type strain of Confluentimicrobium naphthalenivorans at BacDive -  the Bacterial Diversity Metadatabase

Rhodobacteraceae
Bacteria described in 2015